Assassins is a musical with music and lyrics by Stephen Sondheim and a book by John Weidman, based on an original concept by Charles Gilbert Jr.

Using the framing device of an all-American, yet sinister, carnival game, the semi-revue portrays a group of historical figures who attempted (successfully or not) to assassinate Presidents of the United States, and explores what their presence in American history says about the ideals of their country. The score is written to reflect both popular music of the various depicted eras and a broader tradition of "patriotic" American music.

The musical opened Off-Broadway in 1990 to many mixed and negative reviews, and ran for 73 performances; in 2004, the show was produced on Broadway to highly favorable notices and won five Tony Awards, including Best Revival of a Musical.

Background and productions

Background
In 1979, as a panelist at producer Stuart Ostrow's Musical Theater Lab, Sondheim read a script by playwright Charles Gilbert, Jr. entitled Assassins about a Vietnam veteran who becomes a Presidential assassin. The play eventually had little in common with Sondheim's musical, but Sondheim was inspired by its title, its use of quotes from various historical figures who had attempted to assassinate American Presidents, and its opening scene of a shooting gallery with the lighted sign "SHOOT THE PREZ AND WIN A PRIZE" (which was eventually incorporated into the musical).

Sondheim asked Gilbert for permission to use his idea. Gilbert consented and offered to write the book, but Sondheim declined, having already had collaborator John Weidman in mind. Weidman had written the book for Pacific Overtures and would work with Sondheim again on Road Show.

Productions

Assassins opened Off-Broadway at Playwrights Horizons on December 18, 1990, and closed on February 16, 1991, after 73 performances. Directed by Jerry Zaks the cast included Victor Garber, Terrence Mann, Patrick Cassidy, Debra Monk, Greg Germann, and Annie Golden. According to the Los Angeles Times, "The show has been sold out since previews began, reflecting the strong appeal of Sondheim's work among the theater crowd." Frank Rich in his review for The New York Times wrote that "Assassins will have to fire with sharper aim and fewer blanks if it is to shoot to kill."

On October 29, 1992, Assassins opened in London at the Donmar Warehouse with direction by Sam Mendes and a cast that included Henry Goodman as Charles Guiteau and Louise Gold as Sara Jane Moore. The show ran for 76 performances, closing on January 9, 1993.

The first US regional production was mounted by Signature Theatre in Arlington, Virginia in August 1992. The San Jose Civic Light Opera in San Jose, California, presented a production in 1993, which featured the world premiere of the 13-piece orchestration by Michael Starobin.

The first Australian production opened in February 1995, presented by the Melbourne Theatre Company at the Fairfax Studio. Directed by Roger Hodgman, the cast featured John O'May, John McTernan and Bruce Myles.

Roundabout Theater Company's Broadway production was originally scheduled for 2001 but was postponed to April 22, 2004, because the content was sensitive in light of the events of September 11, 2001. After 101 performances at Studio 54, Assassins closed on July 18, 2004. Directed by Joe Mantello, with musical staging by Jonathan Butterell, Neil Patrick Harris starred in the roles of The Balladeer and Lee Harvey Oswald, with Marc Kudisch in an extended role as The Proprietor. Michael Cerveris played John Wilkes Booth, for which he received a Tony Award. The 2004 production was noted for a coup de théâtre: the Zapruder film of the death of John F. Kennedy projected onto Lee Harvey Oswald's T-shirt by projection designer Elaine J. McCarthy. On December 3, 2012, the Broadway cast reunited for a special benefit. Annaleigh Ashford stood in for Mary Catherine Garrison.

Other professional productions have included a 2006 production at Crucible Theatre, Sheffield, a 2008 production which ran from January 23 to February 2, 2008, at the Landor Theatre, London, The South African premiere opened in December 2008 as the inaugural production of the NewSpace Theatre in Cape Town. This production was directed by Fred Abrahamse with a South African cast including Marcel Meyer as John Wilkes Booth, Riaan Norval as Lee Harvey Oswald, David Dennis as Charles J. Guiteau and Anthea Thompson as Sara Jane Moore. The Los Angeles premiere opened in 1994 at the Los Angeles Theatre Center and included Patrick Cassidy (the original Balladeer) playing Booth, and Alan Safier as Guiteau. A 2010 production in Toronto by BirdLand Theatre and Talk is Free Theatre won the Dora Mavor Moore Award for Outstanding Production in the Musical Theatre Division.

The Union Theatre, London produced Assassins in July 2010, which went on the win Best (overall) Production at The Off West End Awards. It was staged and directed by Michael Strassen. It attained Show of the Week and Critics choice in Time Out.

A new production of Assassins starring Catherine Tate as Sarah Jane Moore, Aaron Tveit as John Wilkes Booth, Mike McShane as Samuel Byck, Andy Nyman as Charles Guiteau, and Jamie Parker as the Balladeer opened on November 21, 2014, at the Menier Chocolate Factory in London and ran until March 7, 2015.

Assassins was produced in the 2017 season of Encores! Off Center at the New York City Center from July 12–15 of that year, with a cast including Steven Pasquale as John Wilkes Booth, Victoria Clark as Sara Jane Moore, and Shuler Hensley as Leon Czolgosz.

In October/November 2019 The Watermill Theatre Newbury and Nottingham Playhouse co-produced a new version in the UK, using a full cast of actor/musicians for the first time. The role of the Balladeer was switched to a female part for this production. A poignant moment was added at the end of the final scene, where a young child walks onto the stage from the audience, retrieves a gun from the vending machine (from which the main characters received their weapons at the start of the show) and fires the final gunshot out into the crowd.

John Doyle was to direct an Off-Broadway production at Classic Stage Company scheduled for 2020. On September 24, 2019, it was announced that the cast would include Judy Kuhn as Sara Jane Moore, Will Swenson as Charles Guiteau, Brandon Uranowitz as Leon Czolgosz, Wesley Taylor as Giuseppe Zangara, and Pasquale reprising his role as John Wilkes Booth. Other additions to the cast include Ethan Slater as Lee Harvey Oswald/The Balladeer and Tavi Gevinson as Lynette “Squeaky” Fromme. The show was delayed due to the COVID-19 pandemic. On September 9, 2021 it was announced that the production would begin performances on November 2, 2021 - January 8, 2022 with an official opening on November 14, 2021. And on November 9, 2021, it was announced that the production would extend through to January 29, 2022. The production ended up officially closing January 24, 2022 due to positive COVID-19 cases in the company. On March 18, 2022, a cast recording album of this production received a wide digital release, which featured all songs as well as an abridged version of the climactic scene between Booth and Oswald.

Characters 
Fictional:

The Proprietor: (Bass-Baritone, G2–F4); gun salesman who provides the characters with their weapons at the beginning of the show.
The Balladeer: (Tenor, C3–G4); narrator who provides the stories of the assassins
Billy: Sara Jane Moore's son.  Moore has a son, but his name is Frederic. 
Ensemble: crowd members, chorus, etc.

Historical:
John Wilkes Booth: (Baritone, F♯2–G4); assassin of President Abraham Lincoln
David Herold: accomplice of John Wilkes Booth in the assassination of President Abraham Lincoln
Charles Guiteau: (Baritenor, A2–A♭4); assassin of President James A. Garfield
President James A. Garfield: twentieth President of the United States
James Blaine: Secretary of State who received a deluge of letters from Charles Guiteau
Leon Czolgosz: (Bass, G♯2–D♭4); assassin of President William McKinley
Emma Goldman: anarchist known for her political activism who also interacted several times with Leon Czolgosz
Giuseppe Zangara: (Tenor, B2–B4); attempted assassin of President-elect Franklin D. Roosevelt
Lee Harvey Oswald: assassin of President John F. Kennedy
Samuel Byck: (Baritone, C3–F♭4); attempted assassin of President Richard Nixon
John Hinckley, Jr.: (Baritone, A2–F♯4); attempted assassin of President Ronald Reagan
Lynette "Squeaky" Fromme: (Mezzo-Soprano, A3–D5); attempted assassin of President Gerald Ford
Sara Jane Moore: (Alto, F3–E♭5); attempted assassin of President Gerald Ford
President Gerald Ford: thirty-eighth President of the United States

Notable cast and characters 
Casts of Original Broadway, off-Broadway, and London productions

Notable Replacements 
Off-West End: (2014–15)
John Wilkes Booth: Michael Xavier
Sara Jane Moore: Anna Francolini

Synopsis 
This synopsis reflects the current licensed version of the show. The published script of the 1992 Off-Broadway production is slightly different.

The show opens in a fairground shooting gallery where, amid flashing lights, human figures trundle past on a conveyor belt. One by one, a collection of misfits enters the stage, where the Proprietor of the game entices them to play, promising that their problems will be solved by killing a President ("Everybody’s Got the Right"). Leon Czolgosz, John Hinckley, Charles Guiteau, Giuseppe Zangara, Samuel Byck, Lynette "Squeaky" Fromme, and Sara Jane Moore are given their guns one by one. John Wilkes Booth enters last and the Proprietor introduces him to the others as their pioneer before he begins distributing ammunition. The assassins take aim as "Hail to the Chief" heralds Abraham Lincoln's offstage arrival. Booth excuses himself, a shot rings out and Booth shouts, "Sic semper tyrannis!"

The Balladeer, a personification of the American Dream, appears and begins to tell John Wilkes Booth's story ("The Ballad of Booth"). The scene changes to Richard H. Garrett's barn in 1865. Booth, mudstained and with a broken leg, is attempting to write his reasons for killing Lincoln in his diary but cannot hold the pen. He forces his associate David Herold to write for him at gunpoint. As Booth dictates, blaming Lincoln for the Civil War and for destroying the South, the Balladeer interjects that Booth's motives really had more to do with his personal problems. When a Union soldier calls for Booth's surrender, Herold abandons him and surrenders. In desperation, Booth throws the Balladeer his diary so that he can tell his story to the world. The Balladeer reads out Booth's justifications, and Booth laments that the act for which he has given up his life will not be enough to heal the country. As the Union soldiers set fire to the barn, Booth commits suicide, and the Balladeer concludes that Booth was a madman whose treacherous legacy only served as inspiration for other madmen like him to damage the country. The Balladeer rips Booth's rationale from his diary and burns the pages.

The Assassins gather in a bar. Guiteau toasts to the Presidency of the United States, speaking of his ambition to become Ambassador to France. Hinckley accidentally breaks a bottle, and Czolgosz flies into a rage, describing the horrors he sees in the bottle factory he works in and how many men die or are injured just to make a bottle like the one Hinckley has just broken. Guiteau jokingly tells Czolgosz to find another job, and the two begin to argue about the American Dream, with Guiteau defending America and Czolgosz dismissing the "land of opportunity" as a lie. Czolgosz becomes enraged and grabs a bottle, barely stopping himself from throwing it across the room. Booth urges Czolgosz to take control of his fate by breaking a bottle himself, but Czolgosz cannot. Zangara complains about his stomach pains, and Booth suggests fixing them by shooting Franklin D. Roosevelt.

A radio broadcast, narrated by the Proprietor, describes Zangara's failed attempt to assassinate Roosevelt. He misses Roosevelt and accidentally kills Chicago Mayor Anton Cermak instead. Five Bystanders are interviewed in turn, telling the audience their personal versions of the event; each is convinced that he or she personally saved the President ("How I Saved Roosevelt"). From an electric chair, Zangara sings his refusal to be afraid and that he hadn't cared whom he killed as long as it was one of the men who control the money. Peeved that as an "American Nothing" he has no photographers at his execution, Zangara is electrocuted as the Bystanders preen for the cameras.

American anarchist leader Emma Goldman gives a lecture from offstage as Leon Czolgosz listens, enraptured. He introduces himself to her and declares his love, but she tells him to redirect his passion to the fight for social justice. She gives him a leaflet that she tells him contains an idea that is "not mine alone, but mine". As she prepares to leave, Czolgosz offers to carry her bag, to which Goldman protests by saying, "They make us servants, Leon. We do not make servants of each other." Czolgosz, in his first display of assertiveness, still insists.

Fromme and Moore meet on a park bench and share a joint. Fromme speaks of the apocalyptic preachings of mass murderer Charles Manson, remembering how they met and declaring herself his lover and slave. Juggling her purse, a can of Tab and a bucket of Kentucky Fried Chicken, Moore claims she is an informant for the FBI (or used to be), has been a CPA and had five husbands and three children. They connect over their shared hatred of their fathers, and using Colonel Sanders as a graven image, they give the bucket of chicken the evil eye and then shoot it to pieces while laughing hysterically. Moore realizes that she had known Manson in high school, and the scene ends as the women scream in delight over their memories of the charismatic killer.

Czolgosz reflects on how many men die in the mines, the steel mills and the factories just to make a gun. Booth, Guiteau and Moore enter one by one and join him in a barbershop quartet in which they honor a single gun's power to change the world ("The Gun Song"). Czolgosz decides his gun will claim one more victim: the President.

Czolgosz arrives at the 1901 Pan-American Exposition and sees that William McKinley is shaking visitors' hands in the Temple of Music Pavilion. The Balladeer sings "The Ballad of Czolgosz" as Czolgosz joins the receiving line, and upon reaching McKinley, he shoots him.

Samuel Byck sits on a park bench in a dirty Santa suit with a picket sign and a shopping bag. He talks into a tape recorder, preparing a message to Leonard Bernstein telling Bernstein he can save the world by writing more love songs, and explaining that he is going to change things by crashing a 747 into the White House and killing Richard Nixon. Then he accuses Bernstein of ignoring him, just like the other celebrities he has recorded tapes for, such as Hank Aaron and Jonas Salk. After flying into an expletive-laden rage, Byck stands up on the bench and angrily sings the chorus to West Side Storys song "America" before storming offstage.

John Hinckley sits in his rumpus room, aimlessly playing a guitar. Lynette Fromme enters and tries to convince him to play her a song (asking for "Helter Skelter"), but he refuses. Fromme notices a picture of Jodie Foster, who Hinckley claims is his girlfriend. When Fromme realizes the picture is a publicity photo from a film, she pulls out a picture of Charles Manson and mocks Hinckley for being in love with a woman he's never met, which makes him throw her out in a fit of rage. Alone, he swears that he will win Foster's love "with one brave, historic act" and sings a love song to her while Fromme individually does the same to Manson ("Unworthy of Your Love"). An image of Ronald Reagan appears on a wall in the back of the stage, and an enraged Hinckley shoots it over and over again, but the picture keeps reappearing. The Proprietor mocks Hinckley by quoting Reagan's famous quips about the assassination as Hinckley fires and fires, missing each time.

Back at the Proprietor's shooting range, Charles Guiteau flirts with Sara Jane Moore while giving her marksmanship tips before trying to kiss her. When she rebuffs him, he becomes suddenly enraged and attempts to attack her. Her gun goes off in his ear, and he backs off, angrily proclaiming that he is extraordinary and will be the next Ambassador to France. The scene changes to a train station, where Guiteau goes to meet James Garfield. He asks to be made Ambassador to France, but Garfield mockingly refuses, prompting Guiteau to shoot him.

Guiteau is arrested and sent to the gallows, where he recites a poem he wrote that morning titled "I am Going to the Lordy". When Guiteau finishes, the Balladeer enters and sings about Guiteau's trial and sentencing while Guiteau merrily cakewalks up to the noose, getting more and more desperately optimistic with each verse. Guiteau sings along with the Balladeer about Guiteau's optimism before he is finally hanged ("The Ballad of Guiteau").

Squeaky Fromme and Sara Jane Moore prepare to assassinate Gerald Ford. Moore has brought along her nine-year-old son and her dog (which she accidentally shoots), which causes an argument between the two women, who briefly turn on each other. Moore accidentally spills her gun's bullets just as President Ford enters the stage. Not recognizing him at first, the two women allow him to help them, but upon discovering who he is, Fromme tries to shoot him, but her gun jams. Having no other resource left, Moore tries to throw her bullets at Ford, shouting "bang" as she does so.

Samuel Byck is driving to the airport to hijack a plane, which he plans to crash into the White House. Growing completely unhinged, he records a message addressed to Richard Nixon, complaining about contemporary American life, how the American public is constantly lied to, and announces that killing him is the only solution.

The assassins congregate in the Proprietor's shooting range once again and enumerate their reasons for taking action. Led by Byck, they lament that they haven't gotten the rewards they were "promised". The Balladeer tells them that their actions didn't solve their problems or the country's and that if they want their prizes they must follow the American Dream. The assassins realize that they will never get their prizes, that no one will ever care if they live or die, and briefly sink into absolute desperation until Byck and the Proprietor lead them in "Another National Anthem," a song for all Americans dispossessed by the dream. The Balladeer attempts to convince them to be optimistic and seek other ways to be happy, but the Anthem grows louder and louder until the assassins force the Balladeer offstage (in the 2004 revival and many productions that followed, the Assassins all surround the Balladeer, transforming him into Lee Harvey Oswald).

The scene changes to the sixth floor of the Texas School Book Depository. The ghosts of John Wilkes Booth, Leon Czolgosz, Charles Guiteau, and the other "would be" assassins including John Hinckley, Giuseppe Zangara, Samuel Byck, Lynette "Squeaky" Fromme, and Sara Jane Moore, appear before a suicidally depressed Lee Harvey Oswald, and convince him that the only way for him to truly connect with his country is to share his pain and disillusionment with it. They slowly and carefully attempt to convince him not to become his own victim and to instead assassinate John F. Kennedy. Booth tells Oswald that by joining them he will finally make a difference, but Oswald refuses. Booth tells him that in the future, when Hinckley's room is searched, Oswald's biographies will be found. Booth tells Oswald that the key to the future is in his hands. Oswald tries to leave, but Zangara addresses him passionately in Italian, his words translated by the other assassins, imploring him to act so their own acts can come alive again. They tell him that he has the power to cause worldwide grief and inspire global passion about himself, a man the world has never cared or heard about. Calling themselves his family, the assassins sing, imploring Oswald to act. He crouches at the window and shoots ("November 22, 1963").

After the assassinations, a group of citizens from different time periods recount what they were doing when they heard that the President had been killed and lament that even though only a single man died, the nation has changed forever ("Something Just Broke").

The assassins regroup once more at the shooting range, now with Oswald among their ranks, and they proudly restate their motto, "Everybody's got the right to be happy," before loading their guns and opening fire on the audience ("Everybody's Got the Right (Reprise)").

Themes

Sacrificing for the Greater Good / Fighting Against Political Injustice 
According to Schrader, out of the nine assassins in the musical, six of them (John Wilkes Booth, Giuseppe Zangara, Leon Czolgosz, Charles Guiteau, Lynette ‘Squeaky’ Fromme, and Samuel Byck) possess the motives to assassinate their targets due to "political injustice and sacrifice for the greater good," and among the six assassins, Booth and Czolgosz have been portrayed to have such motive as their primary reason for their assassination.

 John Wilkes Booth - Sacrificing for the Greater Good
 In the musical, John Wilkes Booth believed that his assassination on President Abraham Lincoln is for the greater good (and was an act of patriotism), which is "supported historically: the Ford’s Theatre Museum notes that Booth was part of a conspiracy to assassinate President Lincoln, Vice President Andrew Johnson, and Secretary of State William Seward in order to put the Union in a state of disarray and anarchy." Knapp states that Booth's motivation is "conveyed musically, self-servingly by his own singing in a quasi-hymnic, sometimes inspirational style," based on the 1991 Original Off-Broadway Version.
 Leon Czolgosz - Fighting Against Political Injustice
 In the scene before The Gun Song, an anarchist Emma Goldman inspires Leon Czolgosz to take actions for his anarchist beliefs and the "societal injustice" that he noticed.  In The Gun Song, Czolgosz had a "moody contemplation of how one gun connects backward to the many lifes it consumes in its manufacture," and later he claims that "[a] gun claims many men before it's done. Just one more," where his assassination target was President William McKinley. The political injustice in Czolgosz's timeline would be the "class inequalities in America."

Desiring Attention 
Many assassins in this musical have their lines reflecting their need for attention, and according to Wang, "what unites each of the assassins is the desire for attention." In How I Saved Roosevelt, Zangara was extremely angry about not having a photographer even at his execution: "and why there no photographers? For Zangara no photographers! Only capitalists get photographers!" Another assassin, Moore, "proclaims that one of her motives was ‘so that her friends would know where [she] was coming from.’"

 Lynette 'Squeaky' Fromme and John Hinckley - Trying to Draw Attention of Their Crush
 Fromme and Hinckley are described to be a "loving couple" in the musical, but they are actually showing their love to try to draw attention from two different persons. Unlike some assassins such as Zangara whose goal and story might reflect many of the themes, these two assassins had only one - to get attention from the person they love (for Fromme, it was Charles Manson; for Hinckley, it was Jodie Foster). In the short monologue before the song Unworthy of Your Love, Hinckley states that "[he] will win [Foster's] love, now and for all eternity."

Idealism and Optimism 
This theme is mainly represented by Guiteau. His idealism and optimism might make audience members "feel more sympathy for Guiteau than for some of the other assassins."

 Charles Guiteau - Look On the Bright Side
 Throughout the musical, Guiteau has his lines and lyrics all trying to show his idealism and optimism towards his life and the world. The quartet The Gun Song, which Guiteau participated in, and the song The Ballad of Guiteau both have him portrayed as an optimist while others are depicted as dark and not so optimistic. For example, in The Gun Song, Guiteau "‘waltzes in cheerfully, holding a gun up admiringly’, and declares: ‘What a wonder is a gun! What a versatile invention,’" while Czolgosz just stated that "[he hates] this gun." Guiteau's idealism is demonstrated by his failed delusions: he always desires what he wants, and when he cannot get it, he gets angry. For example, he angrily shouts to Moore that "[he wants a kiss]" after Moore has already turned him down, and he assassinated President Garfield because he could not be the ambassador to France. His idealism and optimism shows even in his execution scene (in The Ballad of Guiteau): he believed that "[he] shall be remembered" for him assassinating President Garfield.

Pain, Desperation, and Disillusionment 
Pain and desperation are keywords in Zangara's character and lyrics: he is portrayed to be a poor immigrant who suffers a very strong stomachache. In How I Saved Roosevelt, Zangara's pain in the stomach and his desperation of not being able to cure his stomachache turn into his anger and hatred towards the upper class. According to Schrader, the real-life Moore attempted her assassination due to political reasons, yet in the musical, she did so due to an entirely different one: she was so frustrated and desperate about "how to understand and express herself" that she took the "drastic action." On the other hand, Byck's attempt of assassination on President Richard Nixon, is also to "satisfy his personal frustrations."  His solo scene, being the only recording that is not a song in the musical, presents his pain and disillusionment through his words and emotion expressions in Have It Your Way.

 Lee Harvey Oswald - The Unwilling Assassin
 Unlike all the other assassins in the musical, "[Oswald] is portrayed as a desperate man attempting to commit suicide and as the only assassin who had no intention of killing a President." In the scene corresponding to this (the original 1991 Off-Broadway version is called: November 22, 1963), Booth, as the leader of all assassins, tries to convince Oswald to assassinate President John F. Kennedy instead of committing suicide using countless tactics, yet he had to rely on other assassins to convince Oswald to do so. Schrader argues that "audience members who have encountered depression may find a level of consubstantiality with [him], at least until he is convinced to commit murder."

Community 
As Schrader states, "Mark Fulk and Angela Howard suggest that ‘family’ is Assassins’ central metaphor, particularly noting that family is ‘the central concept that binds the group of American assassins and would-be assassins.’"

 Community for Assassins
 In the scene November 22, 1963, the assassins join together in order to persuade Oswald to assassinate President John F. Kennedy while assuring him that he can "connect" to the other assassins. In addition, the assassins interact with each other despite coming from different time periods, in the scene Ladies and Gentlemen a Toast before How I Saved Roosevelt, the scene I Am a Terrifying and Imposing Figure before The Ballad of Guiteau, and the songs Everybody's Got the Right, Another National Anthem, and Everybody's Got the Right (Reprise).
 Community for Bystanders
 Comparing the 1991 original production with other later versions, there is one song added into the musical, which is Something Just Broke. This song is an assassin-free one, where five bystanders mourn the assassinated Presidents. These bystanders have different occupations and were in different timelines, yet are brought together by the assassination tragedies, indicating a sense of community among them.

Versions 
The three versions (original, London and Broadway) were not identical, as roles were combined, and the song "Something Just Broke" was new to the London production. In 1991, Theatre Communications Group published the libretto, which did not feature "Something Just Broke".

The current licensed version of the musical reflects the 2004 Broadway revival. Although the script does not combine The Balladeer and Oswald into a single role, many productions have followed the revival in doing so.

Musical numbers 
 "Everybody's Got The Right" – Proprietor and Assassins (save Oswald)
 "The Ballad of Booth" – Balladeer and Booth
 "How I Saved Roosevelt" – Proprietor, Zangara and Ensemble
 "The Gun Song" – Czolgosz, Booth, Guiteau and Moore
 "The Ballad of Czolgosz" – Balladeer and Ensemble
 "Unworthy of Your Love" – Hinckley and Fromme
 "The Ballad of Guiteau" – Guiteau and Balladeer
 "Another National Anthem" – Balladeer and Assassins (save for Oswald)+
 "November 22, 1963" – Oswald and Assassins
 "Something Just Broke" – Ensemble ++
 "Everybody's Got The Right" (Reprise) – Assassins

Notes:
+ In the original production, the lead part among the Assassins for "Another National Anthem" is sung by Byck. However, in the revised 2004 score, the lead is sung by the Proprietor.

++Added for the 1992 London production

Cultural impact 
Sondheim said that he expected backlash from the public due to the content. "There are always people who think that certain subjects are not right for musicals...[w]e're not going to apologize for dealing with such a volatile subject. Nowadays, virtually everything goes," he told The New York Times.

Historian, commentator, and actress Sarah Vowell introduced her 2005 analysis of the Lincoln, McKinley, and Garfield murders, Assassination Vacation, with a journey from New York City into New England to attend a performance of Assassins.

Assassins was featured in episode 6 of Netflix's The Politician. In the show, they are performing in a school production of the musical, which parallels events occurring in their own lives. The episode included a cover of "Unworthy of Your Love", sung by Ben Platt and Zoey Deutch.

Awards and nominations

Original Off-Broadway production

Original London production

Original Broadway production 

Although Assassins had not run on Broadway prior to 2004, the 1992 London production and 1991 Off-Broadway production led to a ruling by the Tony Awards Administration Committee that the musical is a revival instead of an original musical.

2014 Off-West End production

2021 Off-Broadway Revival

Recordings 
Recordings of both the Off-Broadway production and the 2004 revival were released. The original Off-Broadway version lacks the song 'Something Just Broke', which was added to the show for the subsequent London production. The 1990 recording does however include the full 11-minute spoken-word climactic scene 'November 22, 1963'. The 2004 Broadway recording adds 'Something Just Broke' and several dialogues sections but only includes the second half of the 'November 1963' scene.

While the original Off-Broadway production used just three musicians, the 1990 cast album was fully orchestrated by Michael Starobin, with 33 musicians directed by Paul Gemignani.

The 2021 Off-Broadway revival received its own cast recording on March 18, 2022, making it the third English language recording of the show. It includes the full score, and features the actor-musician cast members playing their respective instruments.

References

Further reading

External links 

 
 
 Assassins on The Stephen Sondheim Reference Guide
 Assassins (Sondheim.com)
 Assassins at the Music Theatre International website
 Live, Laugh, Love: Assassins (includes detail of plot)
 Neil Patrick Harris and Marc Kudisch – Downstage Center audio interview from American Theatre Wing.org

1990 musicals

Broadway musicals
Cultural depictions of John Wilkes Booth
Cultural depictions of Gerald Ford
Cultural depictions of Lee Harvey Oswald
Cultural depictions of assassins
Drama Desk Award-winning musicals
Musicals by Stephen Sondheim
Musicals inspired by real-life events
One-act musicals
Songs about criminals
Tony Award-winning musicals
Works about the assassination of John F. Kennedy